Frank Thomas Stack (August 26, 1891 – October 21, 1956) was a four-term Democratic mayor of Norwalk, Connecticut from 1935 to 1943.

Biography
He was born on August 26, 1891, in Manhattan, New York City to Theresa and Thomas Stack.

He was a plant supervisor at the Hat Corporation of America. He also owned the Stack Hats Company. In response to the Cavanagh Edge, a method of creating a firm edge on hats, Stack invented a two-piece iron that forced the felt along the edge of a hat brim into a groove during the ironing process, thereby creating a beaded edge during the finishing process.

He died on October 21, 1956, in Norwalk, Connecticut. He was buried in Riverside Cemetery in Norwalk, Connecticut.

References 

1891 births
1956 deaths
Burials in Riverside Cemetery (Norwalk, Connecticut)
Connecticut Democrats
American milliners
Mayors of Norwalk, Connecticut
20th-century American politicians